

Winners and nominees

1980s

1990s

2000s

2010s

2020s

Records 
 Most awarded actors: Fernando Colunga, Eduardo Yáñez and Humberto Zurita with 4 times.
 Most nominated actor: Fernando Colunga with 9 nominations.
 Most nominated actor (never winner): Juan Ferrara with 5 nominations.
 Actors who have won all nominations: Humberto Zurita 4 times.
 Actor winning after short time:
 Eduardo Yáñez by (La verdad oculta, 2007) and (Destilando amor, 2008), 2 consecutive years.
 Sebastián Rulli by (Tres veces Ana, 2017) and (Papá a toda madre, 2018), 2 consecutive years.
 Actor winning after long time: Eduardo Yáñez by (Yo compro esa mujer, 1991) and (La verdad oculta, 2007), 16 years difference.
 Younger winner: Juan Diego Covarrubias, 26 years old.
 Younger nominee: Arturo Peniche, 26 years old.
 Oldest winner: Ernesto Alonso, 67 years old.
 Oldest nominee: Juan Ferrara, 63 years old.
 Actors that winning the award for the same role: 
 Sergio Goyri (Te sigo amando, 1998) and Jorge Salinas (La que no podía amar, 2012)
 Juan Soler (Cañaveral de pasiones, 1997) and David Zepeda (Abismo de pasión, 2013)
 Fernando Colunga (Amor Real, 2004) and Sebastián Rulli (Lo que la vida me robó, 2015)
 Mauricio Islas (El Manantial, 2002) and Pablo Lyle (La sombra del pasado, 2016)
 Luis José Santander (Lazos de Amor, 1996) and Sebastián Rulli (Tres veces Ana, 2017)
 Actors nominated the award for the same role: 
 Andrés García (Tú o nadie, 1985) and William Levy (Sortilegio, 2009).
 Rogelio Guerra (Vivir un poco, 1985) and César Évora (La Madrastra, 2005).
 Guillermo Capetillo (Rosa salvaje, 1987) and Daniel Arenas (La gata, 2014).
 Arturo Peniche (Amor en silencio, 1988) and Osvaldo Benavides (A que no me dejas, 2015).
 Juan Ferrara (Valeria y Maximiliano, 1991) and Guy Ecker (Heridas de Amor, 2006).
 Eduardo Capetillo (Marimar, 1994) and Daniel Arenas (Corazón indomable, 2013).
 Actors winning this category, despite having been as a main villain: Ernesto Alonso (El maleficio, 1984), Sergio Jiménez (La traición, 1985), Sergio Goyri (Te sigo amando, 1998), and Jorge Salinas (La que no podía amar, 2012).
 Actors winning this category, has a dual role protagonist and main villain: Juan Diego Covarrubias (De que te quiero, te quiero, 2014)
Foreign winning actors:
 Luis José Santander from Venezuela
 Juan Soler from Argentina
 Andrés García from Dominican Republic
 Francisco Gattorno from Cuba
 Sebastián Rulli from Argentina
 Michel Brown from Argentina

References

External links 
TVyNovelas at esmas.com
TVyNovelas Awards at the univision.com

Actor
Actor
Television awards for Best Actor
TVyNovelas Awards Actor